Sergiu Klainerman (born May 13, 1950) is a mathematician known for his contributions to the study of hyperbolic differential equations and general relativity. He is currently the Eugene Higgins Professor of Mathematics at Princeton University, where he has been teaching since 1987.

Biography
He was born in 1950 in Bucharest, Romania, into a Jewish family. After attending the Petru Groza High School, he studied mathematics at the University of Bucharest from 1969 to 1974. For graduate studies he went to New York University, obtaining his Ph.D. in 1978. His thesis, written under the direction of Fritz John and Louis Nirenberg, was titled Global Existence for Nonlinear Wave Equations. From 1978 to 1980 Klainerman was a Miller Research Fellow at the University of California, Berkeley, while from 1980 to 1987 he was a faculty member at New York University's Courant Institute of Mathematical Sciences, rising in rank to Professor in 1986.

Klainerman is a member of the U.S. National Academy of Sciences (elected 2005), a foreign member of the French Academy of Sciences (elected 2002) and a Fellow of the American Academy of Arts and Sciences (elected 1996).
He was elected to the 2018 class of fellows of the American Mathematical Society.

He was named a MacArthur Fellow in 1991 and Guggenheim Fellow in 1997.
Klainerman was awarded the Bôcher Memorial Prize by the American Mathematical Society in 1999  "for his contributions to nonlinear hyperbolic equations". He is currently a co-Editor-in-Chief of Publications Mathématiques de l'IHÉS.

Major publications

 Klainerman, Sergiu; Majda, Andrew. Compressible and incompressible fluids. Comm. Pure Appl. Math. 35 (1982), no. 5, 629–651. 
 Klainerman, Sergiu. Global existence of small amplitude solutions to nonlinear Klein-Gordon equations in four space-time dimensions. Comm. Pure Appl. Math. 38 (1985), no. 5, 631–641.
 Klainerman, Sergiu. Uniform decay estimates and the Lorentz invariance of the classical wave equation. Comm. Pure Appl. Math. 38 (1985), no. 3, 321–332.
 Klainerman, S. The null condition and global existence to nonlinear wave equations. Nonlinear systems of partial differential equations in applied mathematics, Part 1 (Santa Fe, N.M., 1984), 293–326, Lectures in Appl. Math., 23, Amer. Math. Soc., Providence, RI, 1986.
 Klainerman, S.; Machedon, M. Space-time estimates for null forms and the local existence theorem. Comm. Pure Appl. Math. 46 (1993), no. 9, 1221–1268.
 Klainerman, S.; Machedon, M. Smoothing estimates for null forms and applications. A celebration of John F. Nash, Jr., Duke Mathematical Journal 81 (1995), no. 1, 99–133 (1996).
 Klainerman, Sergiu; Sideris, Thomas C. On almost global existence for nonrelativistic wave equations in 3D. Comm. Pure Appl. Math. 49 (1996), no. 3, 307–321.

Books
 Christodoulou, Demetrios; Klainerman, Sergiu. The global nonlinear stability of the Minkowski space. Princeton Mathematical Series, 41. Princeton University Press, Princeton, NJ, 1993. x+514 pp. 
 Klainerman, Sergiu; Nicolò, Francesco. The evolution problem in general relativity. Progress in Mathematical Physics, 25. Birkhäuser Boston, Inc., Boston, MA, 2003. xiv+385 pp.

References

External links
Sergiu Klainerman personal webpage, Department of Mathematics, Princeton University

1950 births
Living people
Scientists from Bucharest
Romanian Jews
University of Bucharest alumni
20th-century American mathematicians
21st-century American mathematicians
20th-century Romanian mathematicians
Members of the French Academy of Sciences
Members of the United States National Academy of Sciences
Princeton University faculty
Courant Institute of Mathematical Sciences alumni
Fellows of the American Academy of Arts and Sciences
Fellows of the American Mathematical Society
MacArthur Fellows
Courant Institute of Mathematical Sciences faculty
PDE theorists
Jewish American scientists
21st-century Romanian mathematicians
Romanian emigrants to the United States
American people of Romanian-Jewish descent
21st-century American Jews